Schorndorf station is in the city of Schorndorf in the German state of Baden-Württemberg. It was opened in 1861 along with the Rems Railway from Stuttgart to Aalen. The abbreviation of the station is TSF and it is currently used by about 10,000 passengers a day.

Location 
The station is situated on the northern edge of the historic Altstadt of the city of Schorndorf in the centre of the city. Next to the station to its east is the central bus station, to the west was the former freight yard.

Layout of the station 

The station consists of a Renaissance Revival reception building completed in 1863 with some later additions.

It has six tracks, namely platform tracks 1–5 and track 14 to the west of the station. Tracks 1–3 and track 5 are in normal use while track 14 is occasionally used for S-Bahn services. Otherwise, this track is mostly used for storing S-Bahn trains.

Track 5 is used exclusively for services of the Wieslauf Valley Railway. It is—since the removal of an eastern connection—only connected on the western side of the station to the Rems Railway.

All platforms are equipped with ramps and lifts for access for the disabled.

As part of the economic stimulus platform, the reception building was rehabilitated with energy-related measures. In addition, the platform roof on the main platform is being renovated.

History 

With the completion of the Fils Valley Railway in 1850, construction of the Rems Railway began in 1858. The line was originally planned in 1845 to pass south of the city of Schorndorf. The local council and the citizens' committee decided in 1858 not to support this solution. Construction of the section through Schorndorf began in 1860.

The railway construction occurred at a time of great misery in Schorndorf and saved many people from starvation or emigration. The station was built between the former centre, now the Old City (Altstadt) and the suburbs. A trial run on the section from Cannstatt to Schorndorf was celebrated at the station on 23 June 1861. The station was opened on 18 July 1861. A week later, on 25 July 1861, scheduled operation started on the line from Cannstatt to Wasseralfingen (to the east of Aalen). On 3 October 1863, the line (now part of the Ries Railway) was opened from Wasseralfingen to Nördlingen.

In 1873 and 1874, there were also plans for a connection from Schorndorf to Plochingen, but this project was rejected. Other plans had called for a line from Schorndorf to Ludwigsburg, but this idea was not realized.

In 1908, the Wieslauf Valley Railway opened and Schorndorf station became a junction.

Schorndorf station signal box "Sf"  (s=Schorndorf, f=dispatcher) of class Sp Dr S59 (track map push-button switchboard from Siemens, class 59) was put into operation in 1962, but it was closed on 1 July 2001. Since then, Schorndorf station has been remotely controlled from Waiblingen.

Operations

The station is classified by Deutsche Bahn as a category 3 station.

Long distance 
In the early morning and late evening some InterCity trains on the Karlsruhe–Nuremberg route stop at Schorndorf station.

Regional transport 
Schorndorf is an intermediate station of regional services (line RB13/R2) running every half hour from Stuttgart to Aalen. It is served every two hours by Interregio-Express trains from Karlsruhe to Aalen. Schorndorf station is the terminus of line S2 of the Stuttgart S-Bahn from Filderstadt. The Wieslauf Valley Railway, operated by the Württembergische Eisenbahn-Gesellschaft, branches off east of the station to the north to Rudersberg.

Freight 
West of the station is the siding of the logistics centre of the appliance manufacturer Bauknecht, owned by Whirlpool Corporation. It gets 20% of its incoming freight by rail.

There used to be an extensive industrial railway network in Schorndorf, connecting the Hammerschlag industrial area through the suburban streets to the Rems Railway. Even the Bauknecht factory had a rail connection until 2000.

Services at the station 
The station building has ticket counters, a bakery and a kiosk. In the neighbouring former Express freight building there is now a book and magazine store and an Internet café.

References

Footnotes

Sources

External links 
 
 
 

Stuttgart S-Bahn stations
Railway stations in Baden-Württemberg
Railway stations in Germany opened in 1861
19th-century establishments in Württemberg
Buildings and structures in Rems-Murr-Kreis